Tyson Lake is a lake in Yellow Medicine County, in the U.S. state of Minnesota.

Tyson Lake was named for Joseph Tyson, a pioneer who settled there.

References

Lakes of Minnesota
Lakes of Yellow Medicine County, Minnesota